Extreme Behavior is the debut studio album by American rock band Hinder. It was released in 2005 by Universal Records to generally negative reviews, before going platinum in September 2006. All songs were co-written by Brian Howes, except for "Shoulda", which was co-written with Brian Howes and Social Code. The song "Running in the Rain" did not make the cut for the album, but has been played at concerts on their North American tour.

Release
The first single (and the song that brought attention to the band) was "Get Stoned". The album also contains Hinder's breakthrough single, "Lips of an Angel" which soared to #1 on the pop charts in 2006. The album's third single was "How Long", which was played on rock stations throughout the US. "Better Than Me" is the fourth single on Extreme Behavior. As of July 11, 2007, the album has sold 2,789,275 copies in the US. Despite not being released as a single, the song "By the Way" also had received airplay from several radio stations.

Cover
The cover art is nearly identical to the cover art of the book How to Tell a Naked Man What to Do: Sex Advice from a Woman Who Knows by Candida Royalle; the only difference is on the book, the model is wearing black lingerie. One of the cover pictures has been altered and the pictures in front of the model have been altered to include the members of Hinder. The alternative album cover has been used in conservative markets like the Philippines and the Middle East. The woman on the front of the original cover is not actress Katherine Heigl, despite common assertion.

Reception

Critical reviews of the album were mixed to negative. Extreme Behavior was, according to AllMusic, one of the worst albums of 2005; it was rated two out of five stars. In its review of the album, reviewer Johnny Loftus said that "Hinder are so egregiously dull they appeal not to fans of music, but fans of high fives."

Track listing
All music and lyrics written by Hinder and Brian Howes, apart from lyrics on tracks 1, 2 and 3 by Hinder, Howes and Joey Moi.

Personnel
Austin John Winkler – lead vocals, guitar
Joe "Blower" Garvey – lead guitar, backing vocals
Mark King – rhythm guitar, backing vocals
Mike Rodden – bass guitar, backing vocals
Cody Hanson – drums, backing vocals
Robin Diaz – drums

Production
Brian Howes – producer
Mike Fraser – engineer
Randy Staub - mixing (except Track 8)
Chris Lord-Alge – mixing on "Lips of an Angel"
George Marino - mastering at Sterling Sound, New York, NY

Charts

Weekly charts

Year-end charts

Decade-end charts

Certifications

References

2005 debut albums
Hinder albums
Universal Records albums
Albums recorded at Armoury Studios